The Army Dental Corps (ADC) is a specialist corps in the Indian Army which primarily provides dental services to all Army personnel, serving and veterans, along with their families.

History

History of dentistry in India dates back to vedic era. Patanjali and Sushruta were vedic era surgeons who wrote about extraction of teeth, forceps, transplantation of teeth from captured or dead enemies, and reconstruction of jaws, face and nose damaged in the acts of war or violence. Earlier Indians used to maintain dental hygiene. They used datun, especially from neem and babool twigs, to clean the teeth. Indians also used false teeth, in 1193 CE the body of Jayachandra was identified by his false teeth. Indians did not use refined sugar or crystal sugar and incidences of dental caries were low. Refined sugar or crystal sugar were introduced by the British raj in 19th century, and started to be used more commonly only after World War II. Consequently, incidences of dental caries among Indians increased with the usage of these from 20% population in 1950 to 50% by 1970 and 70% by 1990s.

Western medical practice reached India in 1600 CE with the first fleet of the British East India Company, consisting of five ships, each of which had two barber surgeon. They established shore-based factories for trade and progressively gained their colonial rule over India. In 1822 CE, first western-style medical institute for training was opened at Kolkatta, which became Medical College and Hospital, Kolkata. First-ever dental college was established in England in 1855. Dr. Rafiuddin Ahmed, who is considered father of dentistry in India, established first-ever recognised dental institute in India in 1925 after obtaining his Doctor of Denta Surgery degree from University of Iowa. 

Dentistry was part of British colonial rule's Indian Medical Service (IMS). The first Indian who joined the IMS was Dr. S.C.G. Chukerbutty in 1855. Regular dental treatment for British troops in India started in 1905 when special pay was paid to medical officers including dentists. Between the First and Second World Wars, many British military officers of British raj and their families did not like to be treated by the Indian doctors of IMS. However, the shortage of doctors due to the outbreak of the World War II forced the British Raj to recruit Indian doctors not only as the lower grade IMD (Indian Medical Department) but also as the higher grade of IMS, which was previously available only to British nationals. After the 1940, when it was decided that a large number of otherwise fit candidates who get rejected due to the dental caries could be easily recruited, the Indian Army Dental Corps (IADC) expanded significantly.

Recruitment
Physically fit candidates can apply for the recruitment in IADC after the completion of Bachelor of Dental Surgery or an equivalent degree recognised by the Dental Council of India.

See also
Army ranks and insignia of India 
Army Medical Corps (India)
Command Hospital
List of Armed Forces Hospitals In India
Women in Indian Armed Forces

References 

History of India
Dentistry in India

Administrative corps of the Indian Army
Dental organisations based in India
Military dentistry